Geographic regions of the Commonwealth of Pennsylvania.

Lehigh Valley

The Lehigh Valley is named for the Lehigh River, which flows through it. The region includes Allentown, the third most populated city in Pennsylvania, the neighboring eastern Pennsylvania cities of Bethlehem and Easton, and its more rural suburbs. The region was once a hub for American heavy manufacturing. Its economy is now more diverse, and it has one of the state's fastest growing populations. It includes two counties:
 Lehigh County
 Northampton County 
 Population (2020): 687,509

Southeastern Pennsylvania

Delaware Valley

The Delaware Valley is named for the Delaware River, which flows through the region. It consists of the following counties:
 Bucks
 Chester
 Delaware
 Montgomery
 Philadelphia
 Population (2020): 6.245 million
This valley primarily contains Philadelphia and its surrounding Delaware Valley metropolitan area.

Pennsylvania Piedmont

Pennsylvania's Piedmont region is a heavily agricultural section of the Piedmont Plateau located in Southeastern Pennsylvania. It consists of the following Pennsylvania counties:

 Adams
 Berks
 Bucks
 Chester
 Cumberland
 Dauphin
 Franklin
 Lancaster
 Lebanon
 Montgomery
 York
 Population (2019): 5,006,221

Pennsylvania Dutch Country

Pennsylvania Dutch Country refers to an area of Southeastern Pennsylvania that has a high percentage of Amish, Mennonite, and "Fancy Dutch" residents. The Pennsylvania Dutch language was historically common, and is still spoken today by many of the Amish people residing in the state.

Consisting of the following counties:
 York
 Perry
 Berks
 Cumberland
 Adams
 Lebanon
 Franklin
 Lancaster

Northeastern Pennsylvania

Northeastern Pennsylvania

This mountainous area of Pennsylvania includes the Pocono Mountains, the Endless Mountains, and former anthracite coal mining cities, boroughs, and villages.

Consisting of the following counties:
Bradford County 
Carbon County 
Columbia County 
Lackawanna County 
Luzerne County 
Monroe County
Montour County 
Northumberland County 
Pike County 
Schuylkill County 
Sullivan County 
Susquehanna County
Wayne County 
Wyoming County

The Poconos

The Poconos, or the Pocono Mountains region, is a mountainous region of about 2,400 square miles (6,200 km²) located in Northeastern Pennsylvania, approximately 30 miles north of Allentown, which is a nationally popular recreational winter destination for skiing, snowboarding, and other winter sports and (in off-season months) for hiking, kayaking, tubing, and other recreational activities.

Consisting of the following counties:
 Carbon
 Monroe
 Pike
 Wayne
May be considered part of the Poconos
 Lackawanna
 Schuylkill
 Luzerne
 Susquehanna

Coal Region

The Coal Region is a term used to refer to an area of Northeastern Pennsylvania in the central Appalachian Mountains.  The region is home to the largest known deposits of anthracite coal in the world with an estimated a reserve of seven billion tons.
 Schuylkill
 Carbon
 Northumberland
 Columbia
 Luzerne
 Lackawanna

Wyoming Valley

Wyoming Valley is a region of Northeastern Pennsylvania shaped like a crescent and part of the ridge-and-valley or folded Appalachians, which includes the metropolitan areas of Scranton and Wilkes-Barre.

Consisting of the following counties:
 Luzerne
 Lackawanna
 Wyoming

Endless Mountains

The Endless Mountains are a chain of mountains in Northeastern Pennsylvania that are part of the Appalachian Mountains chain. The mountains are not true mountains, geologically speaking, but are a dissected plateau and part of the Allegheny Plateau,along with the higher Catskill Mountains to the east of the Endless Mountains in New York state.

Consisting of the following counties:
 Sullivan
 Wyoming
 Bradford
 Susquehanna

Northern Tier

The Northern Tier is a geographic region in Northeastern Pennsylvania.

Consisting of the following counties:
 Sullivan
 Wyoming
 Bradford
 Susquehanna
 Tioga
 Potter
 McKean

Central Pennsylvania

Susquehanna River Valley

The Susquehanna River is a river in the Northeastern United States. At approximately 410 mi (715 km) in length, it is the longest river on the East Coast.

South Central Pennsylvania

Consisting of the following counties:
 Adams
 Cumberland
 Dauphin
 Franklin
 Huntingdon
 Juniata
 Lancaster
 Lebanon
 Mifflin
 Perry
 Snyder
 York
Parts of these counties may be considered part of South Central Pennsylvania:
 Schuylkill
 Berks
 Northumberland
 Fulton

Southern Alleghenies (West Central)  

Southern Alleghenies is a geographic region of West Central Pennsylvania, consisting of the following counties:
 Bedford
 Blair
 Cambria
 Fulton
 Huntingdon
 Somerset

Happy Valley

 Happy Valley is a large valley located in central Pennsylvania. Pennsylvania State University is located in the valley.
Consisting of the following county:
 Centre

Cumberland Valley

Cumberland Valley is a geographic region that lies between South Mountain and Blue Ridge Mountains of Central Pennsylvania and Western Maryland.

Consisting of the following counties:
 Cumberland
 Franklin

Western Pennsylvania

Laurel Highlands

The Laurel Highlands, in the southwestern part of the state of Pennsylvania, traverses the Laurel and Chestnut ridges of the Allegheny Mountains.

Consisting of the following counties:
 Fayette
 Somerset
 Cambria
 Westmoreland

Greater Pittsburgh

Also known as Southwestern Pennsylvania, the region consists of the following counties:
 Allegheny
 Armstrong
 Beaver
 Butler
 Washington
 Westmoreland
 Fayette

Allegheny National Forest

The Allegheny National Forest is a National Forest located in northwestern Pennsylvania. The forest covers over 500,000 acres (2,000 km²) of land.

Consisting of the following counties:
 Forest
 Elk
 Warren
 McKean

Northwestern Pennsylvania

 Erie
 Crawford
 Mercer
 Venango
 Warren
 Lawrence
 Butler
 Clarion
 Forest

References

External links